Happy Birthday Oscar Wilde is a 2004 documentary film that celebrates Oscar Wilde's 150th birthday. Over 150 of his well-known quotes are delivered by 150 of stars in stage, screen and music.

Cast

 Simon Williams
 Jillian Armenante
 Edward Asner 
 Helen Baxendale
 Stephanie Beacham
 Emma Bolger
 Sarah Bolger
 Bono
 Barry Bostwick
Dawn Bradfield
 Barbara Brennan
 Roscoe Lee Browne
 Melanie Brown
 Jean Butler
 Gerard Byrne
Jonathan Byrne
 Bobby Cannavale
 Gary Carter
 Anna Chancellor
Rob Clark
 James Cromwell
 Tyne Daly
 Bob Dishy
Alice Dodd
 Alison Doody
 Roma Downey
 Keith Duffy
 Adrian Dunbar
 Colin Dunne
 Hector Elizondo
 Michael Emerson
 Kathryn Erbe
Kevin Fabian
 Gavin Friday
 Philip Glass
 Ricky Paull Goldin
 Mikey Graham
 Lee Grant
 Tom Hickey
 William Hootkins
Ciara Hughes
 David Henry Hwang
 Allison Janney
 Tina Kellegher
 Brian Kennedy
 Emma Kennedy
 Maria Doyle Kennedy
 Mimi Kennedy
Pat Kinevane
 Mark Lambert
 Annie Lennox
 Dinah Manoff
 Julianna Margulies
 Jefferson Mays
 Frank McCourt
 Frank McGuinness
 Tom McGurk
 Charlotte Moore
 Larry Mullen, Jr.
 Bryan Murray
 Liam Neeson
 Brían F. O'Byrne
 Hugh O'Conor
 Brian O'Driscoll
 Deirdre O'Kane
 Milo O'Shea
Kitty O'Sullivan
 Nathaniel Parker
 Estelle Parsons
 Rosie Perez
 Sue Perkins
 Tonya Pinkins
 Anita Reeves
 Joan Rivers
Owen Roe
 Mitchell Ryan
 Richard Schiff
 Nick Seymour
 Martin Sheen 
 Michael Sheen
 Jim Sheridan
 Bill Shipsey
 Nina Siemaszko
 Alan Stanford
 Eric Stoltz
 Kim Thomson
 Lily Tomlin
 Marty Whelan
 Olivia Williams
 Don Wycherley
 Anthony Zerbe

External links
 

2004 television films
2004 films
2004 documentary films
American documentary films
2000s English-language films
2000s American films